Schnabelburg Castle was a small castle erected in 1150 by the lords of Eschenbach (Switzerland, near Lucerne) on the Albis chain South-west of Zurich, Switzerland, overlooking the nearby Schnabellücken pass.

In 1309 the Schnabelburg was destroyed by the Habsburgs, in revenge for the participation of  Walter von Eschenbach in the murder of Albert I of Germany.  All that is left today is low ruins, reachable in about 30 minutes on foot from the Albis Pass.

Castles in the canton of Zürich